Parliamentary elections were held in Georgia on 5 November 1995, with a second round on 19 November. The result was a victory for the Union of Citizens of Georgia, which won 108 of the 235 seats. Voter turnout was 66.6%

Due to its breakaway status, the elections were not held in Abkhazia, resulting in the 12 MPs elected in 1992 retaining their seats.

Results

References

1995 in Georgia (country)
Parliamentary elections in Georgia (country)
Georgia
Georgia
Election and referendum articles with incomplete results